Oenomaus druceus is a species of butterfly of the family Lycaenidae. It is found in Brazil.

References

Butterflies described in 2008
Eumaeini